The 1940–41 Gauliga Ostmark was the third season of the Gauliga Ostmark, the first tier of football in German-annexed Austria from 1938 to 1945, officially referred to as Ostmark.

SK Rapid Wien won the championship and qualified for the 1941 German football championship which it won by defeating FC Schalke 04 4–3 in the final.

The Gauliga Ostmark and Gauliga Donau-Alpenland titles from 1938 to 1944, excluding the 1944–45 season which was not completed, are recognised as official Austrian football championships by the Austrian Bundesliga.

Table
The 1940–41 season saw three new clubs in the league, Floridsdorfer AC, Grazer SC and Linzer ASK. Compare to the previous season the league had seen an expansion from eight to ten teams.

Results

References

External links
 Das Deutsche Fussball Archiv  Historic German league tables

Gauliga Ostmark seasons
Austria
Football
1940–41 in German football leagues